The Dyavolska reka ("devil's river") is a river in Burgas Province, southeastern Bulgaria. It originates in the Strandzha mountains, runs near the coastal town of Primorsko, and flows into the Black Sea. In its middle course, it forms a marshy area known as Dyavolsko blato ("devil's swamp").

Rivers of Bulgaria
Landforms of Burgas Province
Strandzha
Tributaries of the Black Sea